Francis Gamichon (born 1941) is a French former figure skater who competed in ice dance. With his skating partner, Brigitte Martin, he won bronze at the 1967 European Figure Skating Championships in Ljubljana, Yugoslavia.

Competitive highlights

With Brigitte Martin

With Ghislaine Houdas (Bertrand-Houdas)

References 

1941 births
French male ice dancers
Living people